Crataegus rivularis is a species of hawthorn known by the common name river hawthorn. It is native to the intermontane region of the northwestern United States, situated between the coastal ranges and the Rocky Mountains.

C. rivularis is one of the black-fruited hawthorn species. It is closely related to C. erythropoda, and less closely related to C. saligna.

Images

See also
 List of hawthorn species with black fruit

References

rivularis
Flora of North America